Sculpture automatique avec certaines interventions dirigées: Ombre chinoise, is an sculpture by Hans Arp. It belongs to the collection of the Institut Valencià d'Art Modern, in València.

Since the decade of 1930, when the author starts to specialize in the sculptural practice, one of his objectives was to experiment and study the spatial occupation of his works in order to conquest the volumetry. Once he considered to have achieved a good mastery of the volumes, he started working on this sculpture based on Ombres chinoises. The work belongs to the personal language the author defined in previous years, a representation of nature as an ideal for art through abstract and biomorphic forms, characterized by curves and fluctuating motion in their surfaces. The work also synthesizes two of Arp's lines of research: the plastic metamorphosis of organic bodies and volume expansion in the space.

References 

Institut Valencià d'Art Modern
1938 sculptures